The Bali Pro 2018 was an event of the 2018 World Surf League. It was held from 27 May to 9 June at Keramas Beach, Gianyar, Bali, Indonesia, and contested by 36 surfers.

Round 1

Round 2

Round 3

Round 4

Quarter finals

Semi finals

Final

References

2018 World Surf League
Bali Pro
2018 in Indonesian sport
Sport in Bali
May 2018 sports events in Indonesia
June 2018 sports events in Indonesia